Judith Peckham (née Canty; born 9 December 1950) is a former Australian track and field athlete who competed in the 400 metres and 800 metres.

She was a member of the 4×400 metres relay team which finished in fourth place at the 1976 Summer Olympic Games in Montreal, Quebec, Canada and she won the gold medal in the 800 metres at the 1978 Commonwealth Games in Edmonton, Alberta, Canada. She married high jumper Lawrie Peckham.

References

1950 births
Living people
Australian female sprinters
Australian female middle-distance runners
Commonwealth Games gold medallists for Australia
Athletes (track and field) at the 1974 British Commonwealth Games
Athletes (track and field) at the 1976 Summer Olympics
Athletes (track and field) at the 1978 Commonwealth Games
Olympic athletes of Australia
Commonwealth Games silver medallists for Australia
Commonwealth Games medallists in athletics
Universiade medalists in athletics (track and field)
Universiade silver medalists for Australia
Medalists at the 1973 Summer Universiade
Olympic female sprinters
21st-century Australian women
20th-century Australian women
Medallists at the 1974 British Commonwealth Games
Medallists at the 1978 Commonwealth Games